Caerphilly is a constituency of the Senedd. It elects one Member of the Senedd by the first past the post method of election. Also, however, it is one of eight constituencies in the South Wales East electoral region, which elects four additional members, in addition to eight constituency members, to produce a degree of proportional representation for the region as a whole.

Boundaries

The constituency was created for the first election to the Assembly, in 1999, with the name and boundaries of the Caerphilly Westminster constituency.

The other seven constituencies of the South Wales East electoral region are Blaenau Gwent, Islwyn, Merthyr Tydfil and Rhymney, Monmouth, Newport East, Newport West and Torfaen.

Voting
In general elections for the Senedd, each voter has two votes. The first vote may be used to vote for a candidate to become the Member of the Senedd for the voter's constituency, elected by the first past the post system. The second vote may be used to vote for a regional closed party list of candidates. Additional member seats are allocated from the lists by the d'Hondt method, with constituency results being taken into account in the allocation.

Assembly members and Members of the Senedd

Results

Elections in the 2020s

Regional Ballot void votes: 145. Want of an Official Mark (0), Voting for more than ONE party or individual candidate (71), Writing or mark by which the Voter could be identified (4), Unmarked or Void for uncertainty (145)

Elections in the 2010s

Regional ballots rejected at the count: 143

Elections in the 2000s

2003 Electorate: 68,152
Regional ballots rejected: 316

Elections in the 1990s

Notes

Senedd constituencies in the South Wales East electoral region
1999 establishments in Wales
Constituencies established in 1999